Susan M. Johnson (born August 28, 1969), later known by her married name Susan Lipscomb, is an American former competition swimmer who represented the United States at the 1988 Summer Olympics in Seoul.  She competed in the B Final of the women's 100-meter breaststroke and finished with the thirteenth-best time of all competitors (1:11.08).

Susan left competitive swimming after the Olympics in 1988.  She resumed competitive swimming at Southern Methodist University in 1990. She placed third in the 100 yard breaststroke at the 1991 NCAA championships. In 1992 she placed first in the 100 yard breaststroke. She was the first female in the history of Southern Methodist University to win first place in a swimming event. She permanently retired from swimming at that time.

See also
List of University of Texas at Austin alumni

References

1969 births
Living people
American female breaststroke swimmers
Olympic swimmers of the United States
Swimmers at the 1988 Summer Olympics
Texas Longhorns women's swimmers
Place of birth missing (living people)
20th-century American women